Susmesh Chandroth (born April 1, 1977) is an Indian writer, who writes in Malayalam. He won the first Yuva Puraskar for Malayalam in 2011 instituted by the Sahitya Akademi, Government of India. Susmesh Chandroth is also involved in the Malayalam film industry. He scripted and directed the feature film Padmini (film)  based on the life story of the painter T. K. Padmini in the year 2018.

Career 
His first novel D won the Novel Carnival Prize instituted by the  DC Books. In 1998, he scripted and directed a documentary in Malayalam named ‘monsoon Camp: A new objectivity’. He scripted the 100 episodes of the series ‘Haritha Bharatham’ (Green India ) in the Malayalam Television Channel  Amritha T V. In 2006 he scripted the Malayalam feature film ‘Pakal’ (the Day). The short film in Malayalam ‘Ashupathrikal avashyappudunna  Lokam’ (The world which demands hospital)  was scripted in 2007. The short film ‘Athira 10 C’ was also scripted by him. He has written the script of the short film ‘Marichavarude Kadal’ (Sea of the dead) directed by the national award winner Priyanandanan.

List of works

Novel
 D
 9
 Paper Lodge
 Aathmachaya
 Deshathinte RathihasamNovellaMarine Canteen Nayakanum Nayikayum Mamsathinte Ragam Sareeram YanthralochanamStory Veyil Chayumpol Nadiyoram Asupathrikal Avashyapedunna Lokam Gandhimargam Cocktail City Mampazhamanja Swarna Mahal Marana Vidyalayam Sankada Mochanam Barcode Neernaya Ente Makal Olichodum Mumpu  Vibhavari  Nithyasameel Malineevidhamaya Jeevitham Kattakkayam Premakadha Harithamohanavum Mattukadhakalum Kadha; Susmesh Chandroth Kadhaanavakam ;Susmesh Chandroth Apasarppaka Parabhrahma MoorthyChildren's literature
 Amudakuttiyude Chithrapradarsanam Koohu Gramathile KuzhappakkaranEssay
 Asadharana Ormakalum Asadharana Anubhavangalum Decemberile kilimuttakal (Blog Notes)
 Amsham deshathinte Suvisesham Samasthadesham.com  Subhashchandrabosinu  Nere Ippol aarum nokkarillaScreenplayPakal (Feature film)Asupathrikal Avashyapedunna Lokam (Short film)Athira 10 C (Short film)
 Marichavarude Kadal (Short film)
 Padmini (Feature film) 

 Drama
 Mathangavithukalude vilapam Aani DaivamAwards
 2011 Yuva Puraskar Sahitya Akademi Yuva Puraskar, is a literary honor in India which Sahitya Akademi, India's National Academy of Letters.
 2004: DC Books Novel Carnival Award – D 2008: Edasseri Award – Marana Vidyalayam 2010: Ankanam E. P. Sushma Endowment Award
 2010: Kerala Sahitya Akademi Geetha Hiranyan Endowment – Swarnamahal 2010: K.A. Kodungalloor Award – Marana Vidyalayam 2011: Sahitya Akademi Yuva Puraskar – Marana Vidyalayam 2011: Thoppil Ravi Memorial Literary Award – Marana Vidyalayam 2011: Kerala State Television Award for Best Screenplay – Athira 10 C 2012: Cherukad Award – Barcode 2013: C. V. Sreeraman Smrithi Award – Barcode 2013: Abu Dhabi Sakthi Award – Barcode 2013: T. V. Kochubava Story Award – Marana Vidyalayam 2014: Mundoor Krishnankutty Award – Marana VidyalayamReferences

External links
 
 
  https://www.thehindu.com/entertainment/movies/director-sharan-venugopal-on-his-recent-short-film-oru-paathiraa-swapnam-pole/article33641931.ece
  Director Sharan Venugopal on his recent short film, ‘Oru Paathiraa Swapnam Pole’ 
 ക്വാറന്റീൻ കാലത്തെ ഏക നിരാശ: സുസ്മേഷ് ചന്ത്രോത്ത്...
 യന്ത്രങ്ങള്‍ ഗ്രാമങ്ങളെ കീഴടക്കുമ്പോള്‍.
 Guess the Kolkata connection of National Award-winning film ‘Like A Midnight Dream’ 
 Quarantine - A collection of stories by leading authors as wedding gift for daughter.
 ഹരിതമോഹനമായ കഥകൾ...
 തിരുവനന്തപുരത്തെ അവിയൽ, പാലക്കാട്ടെ പച്ചടി; കേരളം മുഴുവനുള്ള രുചി ഒരിലയിൽ!.. 
  ഞാൻ മാറ്റത്തിന്റെ വഴിയിൽ 
 'കഥകളുടെ എണ്ണക്കൂടുതലിലോ കുറവിലോ കാര്യമില്ല, കാലാതിവര്‍ത്തിയായി നില്‍ക്കുക എന്നതാണ് പ്രധാനം'.
 Uplifted female drawings in Padmini Gallery at Ernakulam Durbar Hall; Know about artist TK Padmin 
 പുലവൃത്തം: സുസ്മേഷ് ചന്ത്രോത്തിന്റെ ഏറ്റവും പുതിയ കഥ.

Stories
 
 
 

 Memoirs
 

 Essays
 Collection of 7 essays written in Keraleeyam''
 

1977 births
Malayali people
Malayalam-language writers
Malayalam novelists
Malayalam short story writers
21st-century Indian novelists
Living people
21st-century Indian short story writers
Indian male short story writers
People from Idukki district
Novelists from Kerala
Indian male novelists
21st-century Indian male writers
Recipients of the Sahitya Akademi Yuva Puraskar
Recipients of the Abu Dhabi Sakthi Award